The Dominici Affair (French: ,) is a 1973 French-Italian crime drama film directed by Claude Bernard-Aubert and starring Jean Gabin, Victor Lanoux and Gérard Depardieu. It is based on the Dominici affair of 1952.

Location shooting took place in Ribiers and Peipin in Hautes-Alpes where the real events occurred.

Synopsis
After a British family are found murdered on the road near his family's farm in rural Provence, the old villager Gaston Dominici is arrested and apparently confesses to the crime. He is tried and sentenced to death, but his punishment is commuted on health grounds amid growing doubts about his guilt.

Cast

References

Bibliography
 Harriss, Joseph. Jean Gabin: The Actor Who Was France. McFarland, 2018.
 Kitchen, Martin. The Dominici Affair: Murder and Mystery in Provence. University of Nebraska Press, 2017.

External links

1973 films
Italian drama films
1970s French-language films
Films directed by Claude Bernard-Aubert
1973 drama films
French drama films
Films set in the 1950s
1970s French films
1970s Italian films